Seven Mile Beach is a rural residential locality in the local government area (LGA) of Clarence in the Hobart LGA region of Tasmania. The 2016 census recorded a population of 1286 for the state suburb of Seven Mile Beach.

History 
Seven Mile Beach was gazetted as a locality in 1966.

Geography
The waters of Frederick Henry Bay form most of the southern boundary, and Pitt Water the eastern and part of the northern.

Road infrastructure 
Acton Road (Route C330) passes to the south-west, continuing onto Lauderdale. Estate Drive and Seven Mile Beach Road provide access to the locality from Acton Road. 

Grueber Avenue opened in 2017 connecting Surf Road to the Hobart International Airport and the Tasman Highway (Highway A3) via Holyman Avenue.

References

Towns in Tasmania
Localities of City of Clarence